Chrysaster hagicola is a moth of the family Gracillariidae. It is known from Japan (Hokkaidō, Honshū, Shikoku and Kyūshū), Korea and the Russian Far East.

The wingspan is 4.5–5 mm.

The larvae feed on Lespedeza bicolor and Lespedeza cyrtobotrya. They mine the leaves of their host plant. The mine is flat and is found on the upper side of the leaf. It is linear at the first stage, and then suddenly broadens in the succeeding stage, finally becoming a large blotch covering up to nearly half of a single leaf. The mine is discoloured with yellow or brown on the upper side. Dark brown frass is plastered on the central part of the lower wall of the mine-gallery. In the first four instars the larva is flat and of the sap-feeding type, while in the last instar it is cylindrical and of the tissue-feeding type, but never feeds on the tissue consisting of lower parenchyma cells. At full maturity it cuts a semicircular hole at a corner of the mine through the upper epidermis, and then leaves the mine through the hole to pupate. It spins an oval or ellipsoidal cocoon at an edge of the contracted leaf.

References

Lithocolletinae
Moths of Japan

Taxa named by Tosio Kumata
Moths of Korea
Insects of Russia
Moths described in 1961
Leaf miners